The Oregon Constitution is the governing document of the U.S. state of Oregon, originally enacted in 1857. As amended the current state constitution contains eighteen sections, beginning with a bill of rights. This contains most of the rights and privileges protected by the United States Bill of Rights and the main text of the United States Constitution. The remainder of the Oregon Constitution outlines the divisions of power within the state government, lists the times of elections, and defines the state boundaries and the capital as Salem.

History
The first constitutional documents enacted in Oregon pre-dated statehood. These were the Organic Law of 1843 and the Organic Law of 1845, adopted to govern Oregon Territory. In 1857, leaders of the territory gathered at the Oregon Constitutional Convention and drafted the current constitution. Over half of the document's content was derived in part from the Indiana constitution. The constitution of 1857 included a racial exclusion section that excluded African Americans and Chinese from the state. (See Racism in Oregon.)

On November 9, 1857, Oregon voters approved its first constitution that then became effective upon statehood on February 14, 1859. The constitution was unchanged for the remainder of the 19th century, but has been amended numerous times since 1902 (see List of Oregon ballot measures). The changes have included the introduction of a direct legislation system, which enabled Oregon voters to propose and approve amendments both to the Constitution and to the Oregon Revised Statutes.

In 1905, a coalition of Oregon lawyers advocated for convening a constitutional convention the following year, and drafted plans for the selection of delegates. According to The Oregonian, Portland attorneys were "almost to a man in favor of making the change". Dissenters included Portland attorneys George W. Joseph, who advised "leaving well enough alone", and C. E. S. Wood, who insisted that the recent passage of initiative and referendum system offered sufficient opportunity to amend the constitution as needed. Governor George Earle Chamberlain declined to take a position.

In 1916, Oregonians voted to keep Section 6 of Article II of the constitution, which read "No negro, Chinaman or mulatto shall have the right of suffrage", even though it had been rendered void by the Fifteenth Amendment to the United States Constitution. In 1927, Oregonians finally decided to remove this suffrage exclusion from their constitution.

Differences from U.S. Constitution
The Oregon Constitution is easier to amend than its federal counterpart. Amending the U.S. Constitution requires a two-thirds vote in Congress and ratification by three-fourths of the states.  In Oregon, once an initiative amendment to its constitution has been placed on the ballot by initiative petition, or once a legislative amendment has been referred to the people by a simple majority vote in the state legislature, a simple majority of favorable votes is enough to ratify it.  Placing a petition for an amendment on the ballot requires a number of valid signatures of registered voters equal to eight percent of the total number of votes cast in the last gubernatorial election, higher than the six percent required for a change in statute. See the list of Oregon ballot measures for initiative amendments.

The right to free speech in Oregon is broader than the federal level:

In State v. Robertson, the Oregon Supreme Court has cited this right against parts of Oregon's disorderly conduct statute, against content-based restrictions on billboards and murals, and against laws restricting the sale of pornography.

Later in 1987, the court cited this provision when it abolished the state's obscenity statute in State v. Henry.

Structure

I — Bill of rights
II — Suffrage and elections  (see also Elections in Oregon)
III — Distribution of powers
IV — Legislative department (see also Oregon Legislative Assembly)
V — Executive department (see also List of Oregon state agencies)
VI — Administrative department
VII (Amended) — Judicial department  (see also Oregon Judicial Department)
VII (Original) — Judicial department
VIII — Education and school lands (see also Education in Oregon)
IX — Finance
X — The militia (see also Oregon Military Department)
XI — Corporations and internal improvements
XI-A — Farm and home loans to veterans
XI-D — State power development
XI-E — State reforestation
XI-F(1) — Higher education building projects
XI-F(2) — Veterans' bonus
XI-G — Higher education institutions and activities; community colleges
XI-H — Pollution control
XI-I(1) — Water development projects
XI-I(2) — Multifamily housing for elderly and disabled
XI-J — Small scale local energy loans
XI-K — Guarantee of bonded indebtedness of education districts
XI-L — Oregon Health and Science University (see also Oregon Health & Science University) 
XI-M — Seismic rehabilitation of public education buildings
XI-N — Seismic rehabilitation of emergency services buildings
XI-O — Pension liabilities
XII — State printing
XIV — Seat of government  (see also Oregon State Capitol)
XV — Miscellaneous
XVI — Boundaries  (see also Geography of Oregon)
XVII — Amendments and revisions
XVIII — Schedule

Notes

References

External links

Constitution of Oregon from the Oregon State Legislature
Oregon Bill of Rights
Crafting the Oregon Constitution, a web exhibit from the Oregon State Archives
History of the constitution from the Oregon Blue Book (includes link to printable copy)

 
1859 establishments in Oregon
1859 in American law
Oregon